Mochima National Park is located in the States of Anzoátegui and Sucre (state), on the northeastern coast of Venezuela. The park covers 94,935 hectares and is made up of an exclusively marine area in its western sector (Anzoátegui State), a coastal marine area that includes the Gulf of Santa Fé and Mochima Bay, and a mountainous area that covers the Turimiquire Dam watershed (Sucre State). Mochima Park was created to protect the montane forests of the Turimiquire Range and the country's eastern Caribbean Sea marine landscapes.

However, this is one of the most threatened parks in Venezuela. Recently two large construction projects have altered the park permanently.  A new national highway is being constructed between Puerto La Cruz and Cumana running directly through the park deforesting a 70+ meter wide swath of parkland along its entire course.  Adding to this dilemma is a new natural gas pipeline being built to the east running virtually parallel to the new highway.

Other threats stem from the fact that when the park was created, many human settlements were included inside park boundaries and The National Park Institute (INPARQUES) has been unable to manage the situation properly. Even though educational policies have improved community relations, INPARQUES is highly deficient in terms of park management and administration.

History 

Named after the town of Mochima, it is one of a number of national parks along Venezuela's northeast Caribbean coastline. Created in 1973 it was the second marine park in Venezuela and encompasses the entire shoreline between Puerto La Cruz and Cumaná plus 32 islands just offshore.

Geography 

This coast is a mountainous zone with beaches, gulfs and inlets of extraordinary beauty. Because of various micro-climates, some areas have gigantic cliffs nearly devoid of vegetation dropping into the water while others are lush with jungle vegetation and sandy beaches. Many small towns have sprung up along the 50 km between the cities on either side (Puerto La Cruz and Cumaná).

Climate 

Year-round temperatures range between 22 and 28 °C. Coastal climate has high temperatures and constant trade winds from November until May, while it is a bit cooler with more humidity from June to October.

Size 
The park is sizable 949 km2.

Fauna and flora 
Marine waters in the park are rich in cetacean diversities including such as humpback whales, bryde's whales, sperm whales, pilot whales, and several species of dolphins.

Gallery

External links 
 http://www.parkswatch.org/parkprofile.php?l=eng&country=ven&park=monp

 
National parks of Venezuela
Marine reserves
Protected areas established in 1973
Geography of Anzoátegui
Geography of Sucre (state)
1973 establishments in Venezuela